Amina Inloes is an  American scholar, researcher, educator, public speaker, translator and a Shi'ite Muslim. She has written several books on the subject of Shi'ism.

Personal life
Inloes was born in Irvine, California, United States.

Education 
She has a PhD in Islamic Studies from the University of Exeter on Shi'ia hadith about pre-Islamic female figures mentioned in the Qur'an. Her PhD thesis, submitted in 2015, is entitled "Negotiating Shīʿī Identity and Orthodoxy through Canonizing Ideologies about Women in Twelver Shīʿī Aḥādīth on Pre-Islamic Sacred History in the Qurʾān".

Career 
She works for the Research and Publications Department of the Islamic College and is programme leader for the MA  Islamic Studies program. She is settled in the United Kingdom.

Publications

 The Queen of Sheba in Shi'a Hadith, in Journal of Shi'a Islamic Studies, vol. 5, no. 4 (2012)
 Conversion to Twelver Shi‘ism among American and Canadian women,  in Studies in Religion (forthcoming)by A. Inloes and L. Takim.
 Mukhtar al-Thaqafi: Character versus Controversy, in the Journal of Shi'a Islamic Studies (Volume 2, 2009)
 Review of The Shi'a Revival in the Journal of Shi'a Islamic Studies (Volume 4, 2008)
 The Tragedy of Karbala A Dramatic Interpretation of the Epic of Imam Husain (A).

Translations
 Mulla Muhsin Fayd Kashani
 Spiritual Mysteries and Ethical Secrets: A Translation of al-Haqa'iq fi Makarim al-Akhlaq, tr. A. Inloes, N. Virjee, and M. Tajri (London: ICAS Press, 2012)

References

21st-century Muslim scholars of Islam
Islamic philosophers
Philosophers from California
Living people
American Shia Muslims
Converts to Shia Islam
Female Shia scholars of Islam
Women scholars of Islam
American Islamic studies scholars
Year of birth missing (living people)
Ahlulbayt TV people